Lafitte is a French surname. Notable people with the surname include:
 André-Joseph Lafitte-Clavé, French army engineer
 Ed Lafitte, professional baseball pitcher
 Fermín Emilio Lafitte, Argentine archbishop
 Guy Lafitte, French tenor saxophonist
 Jean Lafitte, French privateer
 José White Lafitte, Cuban violinist
 Laurent Lafitte, French actor
 Pierre Lafitte, brother of Jean Lafitte
 Pierre Lafitte Ithurralde, French Basque priest and author
 Yasmine Lafitte, Moroccan pornographic actress

See also
Laffitte (disambiguation), including some people with that surname

Surnames of French origin
Occitan-language surnames